Johnny "Jabber" Walsh (born 8 November 1957) is an Irish former footballer who played as a midfielder.

He made his one and only appearance for the Republic of Ireland national team on 30 May 1982 in a 2–1 defeat to Trinidad and Tobago in Port of Spain. Walsh scored the opening goal in a 2–1 win for the League of Ireland XI against the Scottish Football League XI on St Patrick's Day 1980.

At club level, he played for many years on the successful Limerick F.C. teams of the 1980s. Walsh made his League of Ireland debut on 3 October 1976. He won a league title with the club in 1980 and an FAI Cup medal in 1982.

Honours
Limerick United
League of Ireland: 1979–80
FAI Cup: 1982

References

External links
 
Johnny Walsh in 'Soccer Players' file at Limerick City Library, Ireland
Details of his only international appearance from soccerscene.ie

1957 births
Living people
Sportspeople from Limerick (city)
Republic of Ireland association footballers
Association football midfielders
Republic of Ireland international footballers
League of Ireland players
League of Ireland XI players
Limerick F.C. players
Association footballers from County Limerick